Pleasant Hill, North Carolina may refer to several places:

Pleasant Hill, Northampton County, North Carolina

Pleasant Hill, Wilkes County, North Carolina
Pleasant Hill/Hawkins House, a historic plantation house in Vance County